Marquez White (born October 29, 1994) is a former American football cornerback. He played college football and basketball at Florida State University.

Early years
White attended Northview High School in Dothan, Alabama. As a freshman, he played at wide receiver. As a sophomore, he was moved to cornerback.

As a senior, he posted 39 tackles, 3 interceptions, 9 passes defensed, one forced a fumble, one fumble recovery and scored four touchdowns via receptions and returns. He also had a 98-yard touchdown reception. 

In basketball, he averaged 19.3 points, 10.3 rebounds and 4.5 assists per game.

College career
White accepted a football scholarship from Florida State University. As a true freshman, he was moved to wide receiver to provide depth for part of the season, but still managed to have 12 tackles and one interception. 

In his first 2 years he was a backup and played mainly on special teams. As a junior, he took advantage of players that left for the NFL and became a starter at cornerback in 13 games opposite of Jalen Ramsey, allowing just 20 receptions and one touchdown, while making 25 tackles (2 for loss), one interception and 2 passes defensed.

He started 13 games as a senior, allowing just 22 receptions and one touchdown, while posting 25 tackles (2 for loss), 2 interceptions and 6 passes defensed.

As a freshman, he was a backup guard for six games in the 2013-2014 basketball season, but opted to concentrate in football.

Professional career

Dallas Cowboys
White was selected by the Dallas Cowboys in the sixth round (216th overall) of the 2017 NFL Draft. On September 2, he was waived after the team traded for veteran cornerback Bene Benwikere. On September 3, he was signed to the Cowboys' practice squad. 

He signed a reserve/future contract with the Cowboys on January 1, 2018. He was waived on September 1.

Orlando Apollos (AAF)
In 2019, White joined the Orlando Apollos of the Alliance of American Football. He was a starter at cornerback until the league folded in April 2019.

St. Louis BattleHawks (XFL)
In October 2019, he was selected by the St. Louis BattleHawks in the 6th round during phase four of the 2020 XFL Draft. On January 21, he was placed on injured reserve before the start of the season. On February 24, he was activated from injured reserve. In March, amid the COVID-19 pandemic, the league announced that it would be cancelling the rest of the season. He had his contract terminated when the league suspended operations on April 10, 2020.

References

External links
 Florida State Seminoles bio

1994 births
Living people
Sportspeople from Dothan, Alabama
Players of American football from Alabama
American football cornerbacks
American men's basketball players
Basketball players from Alabama
Florida State Seminoles football players
Florida State Seminoles men's basketball players
Dallas Cowboys players
Orlando Apollos players
St. Louis BattleHawks players
Guards (basketball)